This is a list of best-selling fiction authors to date, in any language. While finding precise sales numbers for any given author is nearly impossible, the list is based on approximate numbers provided or repeated by reliable sources. "Best selling" refers to the estimated number of copies sold of all fiction books written or co-written by an author. To keep the list manageable, only authors with estimated sales of at least 100 million are included. Authors of comic books are not included unless they have been published in book format (for example, comic albums, manga tankōbon volumes, trade paperbacks, or graphic novels).

Authors such as Jane Austen, Miguel de Cervantes, Alexandre Dumas, Charles Dickens, Arthur Conan Doyle, Victor Hugo, Jules Verne, Rick Riordan, Ernest Hemingway, Jack Higgins, Isaac Asimov and Leon Uris have not been included in the table because no exact figures could be found—although there are indications that they too have more than 100 million copies of their work in print.

List

See also
 List of most translated individual authors
 List of best-selling books
 List of best-selling novels in the United States
 List of best-selling manga

Notes

References

 

Authors of fiction
Lists of writers
Literature records